
First World problem is an informal term for the issues in First World nations that are complained about in response to the perceived absence of more pressing concerns. Although it has been described as "a subset of the fallacy of relative privation", the term is also used by many people to acknowledge their gratefulness for not having worse problems, and recognise their problems in a global context. The term has been used to minimize complaints about trivial issues and shame the complainer, to generate humour at the expense of first world culture, and as good-humored self-deprecation.

History 
The term First World problem first appeared in 1979 in G. K. Payne's work Built Environment, but gained recognition as an Internet meme beginning in 2005, particularly on social networking sites like Twitter (where it became a popular hashtag). In 2012, UNICEF NZ conducted a survey of First World problems in New Zealand, finding "slow web access" to be the most common. The phrase was added to the Oxford Dictionary Online in November 2012, and to the online Macquarie Dictionary in December 2012.

Examples
Things that have been cited as being First World problems include:

Slow Internet access
Poor mobile-phone coverage
Phone battery dying (low battery anxiety)
Television remote not working
Misplacing AirPods (the most frequent complaint about AirPods).  Apple Inc. attempted to alleviate this problem by introducing a "Find My AirPods" application in 2017.
Not being able to find items in a shop
Getting a bad haircut
Bad-tasting fruit

See also
Embarrassment of riches
First World privilege
Maslow's hierarchy of needs
Whataboutism

References

External links

First World Problems Anthem

Internet memes
Social privilege
Slang
1970s neologisms